Anthony Léandre Mfa Mezui (born 7 March 1991) is a professional footballer who plays as a goalkeeper for Rodange 91. Born in France, he represents Gabon at international level.

Career
Born in Beauvais, Mfa Mezui has played club football for Metz B, Metz and Seraing United.

He made his international debut for Gabon in 2010, and was a squad member at the 2012 Summer Olympics. In December 2014, he was named as part of Gabon's provisional squad for the 2015 African Cup of Nations.

References

External links
 
 

1991 births
Living people
Sportspeople from Beauvais
Footballers from Hauts-de-France
French footballers
French sportspeople of Gabonese descent
People with acquired Gabonese citizenship
Gabonese footballers
Gabon international footballers
Olympic footballers of Gabon
Footballers at the 2012 Summer Olympics
2015 Africa Cup of Nations players
2017 Africa Cup of Nations players
Association football goalkeepers
FC Metz players
Ligue 2 players
Ligue 1 players
FC Rodange 91 players
2021 Africa Cup of Nations players
French expatriate sportspeople in Belgium
French expatriate sportspeople in Luxembourg
Expatriate footballers in Luxembourg
Expatriate footballers in Belgium
French expatriate footballers
Gabonese expatriate sportspeople in Belgium
Gabonese expatriate sportspeople in Luxembourg
Gabonese expatriate footballers
Black French sportspeople